Leandro Atilio Romagnoli (born 17 March 1981) is an Argentine former professional footballer who played mainly as an attacking midfielder.

His thin build, short stature and playing style were reminiscent of compatriot Osvaldo Ardiles. What the player – nicknamed Pipi – lacked in physical strength, he made up for with dribbling ability.

Romagnoli started and finished his professional career with San Lorenzo, but also spent four seasons in Portugal with Sporting.

Club career
Born in Buenos Aires, Romagnoli made his professional debut on 13 December 1998 at the age of only 17, appearing for San Lorenzo de Almagro against Racing Club de Avellaneda. He went on to become an essential attacking player for the side, appearing in roughly 200 official games and winning three major titles; amid the club's financial troubles, he was linked with a move to SV Werder Bremen of the German Bundesliga in summer 2002.

Romagnoli signed with Mexico's C.D. Veracruz in January 2005 but, in the same month the following year, he was on the move again, now to Sporting CP, first on loan. He initially found it difficult to adjust to his new side, but eventually came into his own in the 2006–07 campaign in a superb end-of-season run for both team and player, winning the Portuguese Cup; the move was made permanent in that summer.

After having appeared in only 16 matches in 2008–09, being out of favour with manager Paulo Bento, Romagnoli left the Estádio José Alvalade in early August 2009 to rejoin San Lorenzo. He contributed ten appearances as they won their first Copa Libertadores in 2014.

On 24 June 2017, the 36-year-old Romagnoli renewed his contract at the Estadio Pedro Bidegain for one more season. He announced his retirement one year later, remaining tied to the club as director of football.

International career
Romagnoli was part of the Argentina under-20 team that won the 2001 FIFA World Youth Championship. He made his debut with the full side against the United States on 8 February 2003, playing 12 minutes in a 1–0 friendly win.

Honours
San Lorenzo
Argentine Primera División: 2001 Clausura, 2013 Inicial
Supercopa Argentina: 2015
Copa Libertadores: 2014
Copa Mercosur: 2001
Copa Sudamericana: 2002
FIFA Club World Cup runner-up: 2014

Sporting
Taça de Portugal: 2006–07, 2007–08
Supertaça Cândido de Oliveira: 2007, 2008
Taça da Liga runner-up: 2007–08, 2008–09

Argentina U20
FIFA U-20 World Cup: 2001

Individual
Primeira Liga Player of the Month: May 2007

References

External links
Argentine League statistics  

1981 births
Living people
Argentine people of Italian descent
Footballers from Buenos Aires
Argentine footballers
Association football midfielders
Argentine Primera División players
San Lorenzo de Almagro footballers
Liga MX players
C.D. Veracruz footballers
Primeira Liga players
Sporting CP footballers
Copa Libertadores-winning players
Argentina under-20 international footballers
Argentina international footballers
Argentine expatriate footballers
Expatriate footballers in Mexico
Expatriate footballers in Portugal
Argentine expatriate sportspeople in Mexico
Argentine expatriate sportspeople in Portugal
Argentine football managers
Argentine Primera División managers
San Lorenzo de Almagro managers